This article gives an overview of liberalism and radicalism in Hungary. It is limited to liberal and radical parties with substantial support, mainly proved by having had a representation in parliament. The sign ⇒ denotes another party in that scheme. For inclusion in this scheme it is not necessary that parties labeled themselves as a liberal party.

Background
From the start of liberalism in Hungary its program is combined with the struggle for independence from the Habsburg-rule and thus more autonomy in the country's affairs in relation with the Austrian Empire and later Austria-Hungary. The two realists groups, Deákists and Kossuthists, differ in their attitude towards the Habsburg rulers. Both groups had a conservative liberal or even conservative philosophy by the beginning of the 20th century.

History
In the antebellum period, liberalism was very successful and led by the party of Károlyi, but after the communist revolution of 1919, and during the conservative regency, liberalism became limited to small city-based parties. After the 1988 end of communist rule, liberalism reconstituted itself in the Alliance of Free Democrats (Szabad Demokraták Szövetsége, member LI), ELDR), a center market liberal party. Originally also the Young Democrats chose a liberal profile, but soon they developed into a national-conservative party.

Opposition Party
1847: Liberal opposition led by Ferenc Deák and Lajos Kossuth formed the Opposition Party.
1849: The party is banned.

Radical Party
1849: Radical liberals formed the illegal Radical Party.
1868: The party joined with the new 1848 Party.

From Address Party to Liberal Party
1861: The moderate followers of Ferenc Deák formed the Address Party.
1866: After a compromise with the Austrian rulers, the party is reorganized into the conservative liberal Deák Party.
1875: The party merged with the conservative Left Center into the conservative liberal Liberal Party.
1876: The liberal wing seceded as the Independent Liberal Party.
1899: The National Party joined the party.
1904: The National Party seceded from the party.
1906: The party was dissolved.

From Extreme Left to Kossuth Party
1867: Going back to the traditions of the Opposition, liberals formed the Independence and 1848 Party.
1868: The party united with the former radicals into the Independence and 1848 Party.
1874: A faction seceded and formed the Independence Party.
1884: The parties reunited into the Independence and 1848 Party.
1895: An agrarian faction formed the Independence and 1848 Party of Ug.
1904: The parties reunited.
1905: The National Party joined.
1908: A left-wing faction seceded as the Left Party.
1909: A conservative faction formed the 1848 Independence Kossuth Party.
1910: The Left Party rejoined the party.
1912: The radical Countrywide Republican Party seceded.
1913: The party merged with the 1848 Independence Kossuth Party into the United Independence and 1848 Party.
1916: The liberal wing seceded as the Independence and 1848 Károlyí Party.
1919: The party, now a conservative party, is renamed Independence and 1848 Party
and in 1924, it was renamed the Kossuth Party. It was disbanded by 1945.

Independence Party
1874: A faction of the 1848 Party formed the Independence Party.
1884: The parties reunited into the Independence and 1848 Party.

From Independent Liberal Party to National Party
1876: The liberal wing of the Liberal Party formed the Independent Liberal Party.
1878: It joined the more conservative groups and the United Opposition was formed.
1881: The party is reorganised into the Moderate Opposition.
1891: The party is renamed National Party.
1899: It joined the Liberal Party.
1904: The party seceded from the Liberal Party.
1905: It joined the Independence and 1848 Party.

From Communal Democratic Party to Civic Democratic Party
1894: Budapest liberals formed the Civic Democratic Party.
1900: The party is reorganized into a national party and named Civic Democratic Party.
1918: The party split into the National Socialist Party and the Liberal Citizen's Party.
1919: The parties reunited into the National Democratic Party.
1926: The party merged with the FKFPP into the Independent National Democratic Party.
1928: The former FKPP secedes and the party is renamed National Democratic Party.
1942: The party was dissolved.
1944: The party is reorganized into the Civic Democratic Party.
1949: The PDP joined the left-wing non-Marxist Hungarian Radical Party.

Left Party
1908: A left-wing faction of the Independence and 1848 Party formed the Left Party.
1910: The party rejoined with the Independence and 1848 Party.

Countrywide Republican Party
1912: A radical faction of the Independence and 1848 Party formed the Countrywide Republican Party.
1913: The party is banned.

Independence and 1848 Károlyi Party
1916: The liberal wing of the United Independence and 1848 Party formed the Independence and 1848 Party, led by Mihály Károlyi.
1919: After a communist coup, the party is dissolved.

Countrywide Civic Radical Party
1916: Radical liberals formed the Countrywide Civic Radical Party.
1919: The party was dissolved.

Liberal Citizens' Party
1918: A faction of the Civic Democratic Party formed the Liberal Citizens' Party.
1919: The parties reunited into the National Democratic Party.

From Independence Party of Smallholders, Agrarian Workers and Citizens to Civic Freedom Party
1921: Károly Rassay formed, in an attempt to find liberal support outside the cities, the liberal Independence Party of Smallholders, Agrarian Workers and Citizens.
1926: The party merged into the Independent National Democratic Party.
1928: The party is reconstituted as the National Liberal Party.
1934: The party is renamed the Civic Freedom Party.
1944: The remnants of the party joined the Civic Democratic Party.

Alliance of Free Democrats
1988: Just before the collapse of the communist regime, the  liberals Alliance of Free Democrats party was formed.
2010: The Alliance of Free Democrats fell out of the Parliament, and split into several parties.
2013: Former SZDSZ members founded the Hungarian Liberal Party.

Momentum Movement
2015: The Momentum Movement has been founded.
2017: Momentum Movement became a party.

Liberal leaders
19th century: Lajos Kossuth, Ferenc Deák
Alliance of Free Democrats: Árpád Göncz

See also
 History of Hungary
 Politics of Hungary
 List of political parties in Hungary
 Politics in 19th-century Hungary

References

Hungary
Politics of Hungary